The 35th edition of the annual Hypo-Meeting took place on 30 and 31 May 2009 in Götzis, Austria. The track and field competition, featuring a decathlon (men) and a heptathlon (women) event, was part of the 2009 IAAF World Combined Events Challenge.

Men's decathlon

Schedule

May 30 

May 31

Records

Results

Women's heptathlon

Schedule

May 30 

May 31

Records

Results

See also
2009 Decathlon Year Ranking
2009 World Championships in Athletics – Men's decathlon
2009 World Championships in Athletics – Women's heptathlon
Athletics at the 2009 Summer Universiade – Men's decathlon

References
Official results
 decathlon2000

2009
Hypo-Meeting
Hypo-Meeting